The Minister of Children, was first established during the first cabinet of Helle Thorning-Schmidt. The ministerial title has alternatively been assigned to the Minister of Education and the Minister of Social Affairs.

List of ministers

References

External links 

Lists of government ministers of Denmark
Government ministerial offices of Denmark